"Punto 40" is a song recorded by Puerto Rican singers Rauw Alejandro and Baby Rasta. It was written by Alejandro and DJ Playero, while the production was handled by Alejandro, Kenobi, Mr. NaisGai, and DJ Playero. The song was released for digital download and streaming as a single by Sony Music Latin and Duars Entertainment on September 22, 2022.

Background and composition 
"Punto 40" is a remake of the classic reggaeton song with the same name by Baby Rasta & Gringo. The cut represents the first preview of Saturno, Alejandro's third studio album, released in November 2022. The song is inspired by "the spirit of the opening theme" that "gives it a particular rave-like sound". Formed on the basis of classic reggaeton, with this sound, Alejandro departs from his recent synth-pop and disco focus, to deliver a hard-charging reggaeton rave track, thus securing his place in the clubs and lighting up the dance floor and leaving ashes in his wake.

Credits and personnel 
Credits adapted from Tidal.

 Rauw Alejandro – associated performer, composer, lyricist, producer
 Baby Rasta – associated performer
 Pedro G. Torruellas Brito "DJ Playero" – composer, lyricist, producer
 Jorge E. Pizarro "Kenobi" –  producer, recording engineer
 Luis J. González "Mr. NaisGai" – producer
 Marik Cuert – executive director
 Eric Pérez "Eric Duars" – executive producer
 José M. Collazo "Colla" – mastering engineer, mixing engineer

Charts

Certifications

Release history

References 

2022 songs
2022 singles
Rauw Alejandro songs
Songs written by Rauw Alejandro
Sony Music Latin singles
Spanish-language songs